Diocese of Montreal can refer to:

  Roman Catholic Archdiocese of Montreal
  Anglican Diocese of Montreal